Prudnikov or Prudnikoff is a Russian male surname originating from the word prudnik meaning worker at a water mill. Its feminine counterpart is Prudnikova. It may refer to

 Aleksandr Prudnikov (born 1989), Russian footballer
 Aleksey Prudnikov (born 1960), Russian football coach and former footballer
 Anatoli Prudnikov (1927–1999), Russian mathematician
Dmitri Prudnikov (born 1988), Russian futsal player
 Djordje Prudnikov (born 1939), Russian-Serbian artist
Mikhail Prudnikov (born 1928), Russian Olympic rower
Sergey Prudnikov (born 1985), Russian Olympic bobsledder
Svetlana Prudnikova (born 1967), Russian chess player
Tatyana Prudnikova (born 1954), Soviet Olympic swimmer

References

Russian-language surnames